Smyth Channel is a principal Patagonia channel. Its south arm is the southward continuation of the Sarmiento Channel and is located in Magallanes y Antártica Chilena Region. The Kawésqar people lived along its coast for thousands of years.

The channel has a length of approximately 96 nmi and is divided into two arms: the northwest arm, which is scarcely used as navigation route and is 50 nmi long, and the south arm (46 nmi long), which is a major waterway for commercial sailing and that stretches from its connection with the Sarmiento Channel at southern tip of the Victoria Pass until the point already named, where it joins to the Strait of Magellan.

The channel is flanked by mountain ranges of exposed granite that at their foothills have limited vegetation cover, because the continuous winds that blow against it.

In the northwest arm the hills are high, including the Monte Nuestra Señora de la Victoria (890 m) and the Lecky Look Out (890 m) on the Contreras Island, and the Monte Lucía of 510 m on the Diego de Almagro Island.

In the vicinity of its south arm is Monte Burney, which lie on Muñoz Gamero Peninsula in mainland. This imposing volcanic peak stands out from the mountains that surround it. Other mountains in the area include Monte Joy (443 m) and the peaks Sainte Agnes and Sainte Anne with elevations of 323 and 513 m high respectively, which stand on the Manuel Rodríguez Island.

The tidal currents are stable and weak, but influenced by the wind.

On the south branch, there are a number of lighthouses, buoys and beacons as a pilotage aid, which are located specialty at the passes Summer and Shoal, and at the channels Gray and Mayne, all of which lie along its course. There exist special instructions for the navigation in the places mentioned.

In the Shoal Pass lies the hull of the wrecked ship SS Santa Leonor and at its southern end lie the wrecked steamships Moraleda, Magada, Ponte Verde and Recreo

Name 
The channel was named in 1829 by the British sailors Skyring and Graves, members of Captain Phillip Parker King's survey, in honour of the naval officer W.H. Smyth under whom they had served in the Mediterranean.

See also
 
Fjords and channels of Chile
List of fjords, channels, sounds and straits of Chile
List of islands of Chile
List of lighthouses and lightvessels in Chile

References

This article draws heavily on the corresponding article in the Spanish-language Wikipedia, accessed October 13, 2007.
 
 

Fjords of Chile
Bodies of water of Magallanes Region
Channels of Chile